Prince Hassan Air Base (H5) is a Royal Jordanian Air Force base, located 72.4 miles east-northeast of Amman, Jordan.

History
H5 used to be a pumping station for the oil pipeline from Iraq to Haifa and had a landing strip which was used by Royal Air Force and Iraq Petroleum Company mail aircraft flying between Baghdad, Amman and Cairo.

The base was opened in 1969 and named after Prince El Hassan. No. 9 Squadron RJAF was established there with Lockheed F-104A/B Starfighters.

No. 6 Fighter Reconnaissance Squadron RJAF has been based there in the past but has since moved to Muwaffaq Salti Air Base.

Current use

Presently No. 17 Squadron RJAF with Northrop F-5E/F Tiger IIs, are based there. In 1994, the Fighter Weapons Instructor School came to H5.

The United States Air Force has used the base occasionally since the 1980s.

References

Airports in Jordan
Military installations of Jordan